Poshtova Square (translit.: Poshtova Ploshcha, literally: Postal Square) in Kyiv, the capital of Ukraine, is one of the oldest historic squares of the city. Archaeological findings are dated back to the 4th century.

A crossing of several historic streets such as Saint Volodymyr Descent, Borychiv Descent and Sahaydachny Street, the square is located at the Dnipro riverfront right next to the Kyiv River Port.

The square received its name from Podil post station that was opened there in 1846.  The square was also known under an alternative name as the Nativity Square, from the Nativity Church (built in 1810–1814, destroyed by soviets in 1936 and rebuilt in 2004). The square underwent significant reconstruction in the 1970s when the Kurenivsko-Chervonoarmiyska (today Obolonsko–Teremkivska Metro line) was built and only the post station was preserved. Currently, the post station is used as a small art gallery.

Since 2018 the square is a protected heritage site, and is planned to hold at some point in the future a museum dedicated to medieval Kyiv.

Public transport

The square is served by the metro (the Poshtova Ploshcha station), the funicular, and buses.

Kyiv tram has historically significant routes through the square in past, however, on February 23, 2011, last tram service through the square (line 5) was closed, without any clear plans to be reopened in future.

References

 Поштова площа in Wiki-Encyclopedia Kiev

Squares in Kyiv
Podilskyi District